Pioneers of 1889, or simply 1889, is an outdoor bronze sculpture by artist Leonard McMurry and landscape architect Thomas Roberts, installed in Oklahoma City, in the U.S. state of Oklahoma.

Description and history

The artwork was copyrighted on February 25, 1957, completed in 1959, and dedicated on April 22, 1960. The sculpture depicts two settlers, including a young boy on a horse and a man. It measures approximately 9 ft. 5 in. x 5 ft. 9 in. x 10 ft. 6 in. and rests on a polished granite base measuring approximately 7 ft. 3 in. x 6 ft. 9 in. x 10 ft. 6 in.

A plaque on the west side of the base reads: "STRONG MEN AND WOMEN CAME UPON A RAW LAND / WITH VISION... / THEY SPANNED RIVERS AND PRAIRIES AND MOUNTAINS/WITH DETERMINATION... / THEY CREATED SCHOOLS-CHURCHES-FARMS-FACTORIES / THEY LIFTED GREAT BUILDINGS TO THE SKIES / THEY DRILLED DEEP WELLS INTO OIL RICH EARTH / WITH THANKFULNESS TO THEIR GOD... / THEY ARE STILL PIONEERING-STILL ACHIEVING / AND STILL EXPLORING FUTURE FRONTIERS / PASSERBY-LOOK ABOUT AND ASK THIS QUESTION / WHERE ELSE WITHIN A SINGLE LIFE SPAN / HAS MAN BUILT SO MIGHTLY / M.G.T." Another plaque on the base reads: "THIS STATUE COMMEMORATES THE PIONEERS OF 1889 / PRESENTED TO THE '89ERS AND THE PEOPLE OF OKLAHOMA / BY / MR. AND MRS. B.D. EDDIE / APRIL 22, 1960 / LEONARD MCMURRY / SCULPTOR."

See also
 1959 in art

References

External links

 Pioneers of 1889 at cultureNOW
 1889 - Oklahoma City, Oklahoma at Waymarking

1959 sculptures
1960 establishments in Oklahoma
Bronze sculptures in Oklahoma
Equestrian statues in Oklahoma
Monuments and memorials in Oklahoma
Outdoor sculptures in Oklahoma City
Sculptures of children in the United States
Sculptures of men in Oklahoma